Iseo-myeon can refer to three different myeon in South Korea:

Iseo-myeon, Cheongdo County, in Cheongdo County, Gyeongsangbuk-do
Iseo-myeon, Wanju County, in Wanju County, Jeollabuk-do
Iseo-myeon, Hwasun County, in Hwasun County, Jeollanam-do